Kuno Klötzer (19 April 1922 – 6 August 2011) was a German football player and coach who won the 1977 UEFA Cup Winners' Cup managing Hamburger SV.

Born in Geyer, Germany, Klötzer managed several clubs included Arminia Hannover, Hannover 96, Fortuna Düsseldorf (with Matthias Mauritz, Toni Turek, the "football god" and world champion of 1954, and Erich Juskowiak among his team), 1. FC Nürnberg, Kickers Offenbach, Hamburger SV, Hertha BSC, MSV Duisburg and Werder Bremen. His Hamburg side won the UEFA Cup Winners' Cup with a 2–0 victory over R.S.C. Anderlecht on 11 May 1977 at Olympisch Stadion, Amsterdam.

Honours
Fortuna Düsseldorf
Regionalliga West: 1965–66
Intertoto Cup: 1967

Kickers Offenbach
Regionalliga Süd: 1971–72

Hamburger SV
DFB-Pokal: 1975–76
European Cup Winners' Cup: 1976–77

Werder Bremen
2.Bundesliga: 1980–81

References

External links
 
 

1922 births
2011 deaths
German footballers
Association football midfielders
SV Werder Bremen players
German football managers
Fortuna Düsseldorf managers
Hannover 96 managers
1. FC Nürnberg managers
Hamburger SV managers
Hertha BSC managers
SV Werder Bremen managers
MSV Duisburg managers
Bundesliga managers
2. Bundesliga managers
Wuppertaler SV managers
Schwarz-Weiß Essen managers
SC Preußen Münster managers
Rot-Weiss Essen managers
Kickers Offenbach managers
People from Erzgebirgskreis
Footballers from Saxony
West German footballers
West German football managers